Amadeo Ortega (date of birth unknown, died 17 October 1983) was a Paraguayan football forward who played for Paraguay in the 1930 FIFA World Cup. He also played for Club River Plate.

References

External links

Paraguayan footballers
Paraguay international footballers
Association football forwards
1930 FIFA World Cup players
River Plate (Asunción) footballers
1983 deaths
Year of birth missing